Madoyan is an Armenian surname. Notable people with the surname include:

Artin Madoyan (born 1904), Armenian communist politician
Ghukas Madoyan (1906–1975), Armenian Soviet army officer
Karen Madoyan (born 1995), Bulgarian footballer
Nikolay Madoyan (born 1973), Armenian classical violinist

Armenian-language surnames